Psoralidium, scurf-pea, or scurfy pea is a genus of flowering plants in the legume family, Fabaceae. It belongs to the subfamily Faboideae.

Species include:
Psoralidium junceum
Psoralidium lanceolatum
Psoralidium tenuiflorum

External links
USDA Plants Profile

Psoraleeae
Fabaceae genera